Milton Krims (1904–1988) was an American screenwriter,<ref>[https://www.nytimes.com/1988/07/20/obituaries/milton-krims-84-dies-wrote-for-film-and-tv.html Obituary in New York Times] 20 July 1988] accessed 14 June 2014</ref> journalist, short-story writer, and novelist.

Early in his career, Krims was a journalist with magazines in addition to writing novels and short stories. He became involved with films when Paramount bought the rights to one of his novels in the early 1930s and he went to that studio to work as a screenwriter. He went to work for Warner Bros. in the mid-1930s. While he was at Warner Bros., his contract allowed him to take leave to write for Collier's magazine, and in that way he reported on the Battle of Britain, the conference at Munich, and the Spanish Civil War. He returned to working for magazines in the 1970s, when he was film editor for Holiday and The Saturday Evening Post.

Krims's first film scenario was for The Life of Stephen Foster. His first project as a TV producer was Hotel de Paree.

Krims was a member of the Army Air Corps during World War II.

Krims was first married to actress Jayne Meadows. In the late 1950s he married actress Shirley O'Hara.

The Academia Mondiale Degli Artisti Proffessionisti in Italy awarded him an honorary doctor of literature degree.

On July 11, 1988, Krims died of pneumonia at the Motion Picture Country Home and Hospital in Woodland Hills, California, at age 84.

Select credits
 Unmasked (1929)The Western Code (1932)
 Forbidden Trail (1932)Green Light (1937)The Sisters (1938)Confessions of a Nazi Spy (1939)A Dispatch from Reuters (1940)The Iron Curtain (1948)Prince of Foxes (1949)Crossed Swords (1954)Tennessee's Partner (1955)
 The Executioner of Venice'' (1963)

References

External links

Milton Krims at TCMDB
Milton Krims papers, Margaret Herrick Library, Academy of Motion Picture Arts and Sciences

American male screenwriters
1904 births
1988 deaths
20th-century American male writers
20th-century American screenwriters